The Widas River is a river in northern East Java, Indonesia. It is a tributary of the Brantas River.

Geography
The river flows in the eastern area of Java with predominantly tropical monsoon climate (designated as Am in the Köppen–Geiger climate classification). The annual average temperature in the area is 26 °C. The warmest month is October, when the average temperature is around 29 °C, and the coldest is January, at 23 °C. The average annual rainfall is 2982 mm. The wettest month is March, with an average of 496 mm rainfall, and the driest is August, with 28 mm rainfall.

See also
List of rivers of Indonesia
List of rivers of Java

References

Rivers of East Java
Rivers of Indonesia